The sixth series of Mam talent! began airing on TVN on 7 September 2013 and ended on 30 November 2013. Marcin Prokop and Szymon Hołownia returned to present the show. Agnieszka Chylińska and Małgorzata Foremniak returned as judges and were joined by Agustin Egurrola. The series was won by Ukrainian sand artist Tetiana Galitsyna, who received PLN 300,000. The runner-up, folk music band Tekla Klebetnica received the second prize, a car funded by sponsor of the series. Dancer Santiago Gil came third.

Judges and presenters

On 26 May 2013 Agnieszka Chylińska confirmed her return for the sixth series alongside Małgorzata Foremniak. On 4 June 2013 Wirtualne Media reported that Robert Kozyra would leave the panel due to failure of negotiations with TVN regarding his salary. Individuals rumoured to be replacing Kozyra included Hubert Urbański, Piotr Kędzierski, Marcin Prokop and YouTube personality Łukasz Jakóbiak.  On 7 June 2013 Agustin Egurrola was announced as the new judge.

Presenting duo Marcin Prokop and Szymon Hołownia returned for their sixth year on the show.

Auditions

Open auditions
Open auditions were taking place in eight polish cities throughout April 2013. The final open audition was held on 8 June 2013 in Warsaw.

Judges' auditions

Filmed judge's auditions with live audience began on 16 June in Katowice and ended on 18 July 2013 in Warsaw.  They were held in theatres in five Polish cities.

Semi-finals

Semi-finals summary

Semi-final 1 (26 October)
Guest performer: Delfina & Bartek

Semi-final 2 (2 November)
Guest performer: Marcin Muszyński

Semi-final 3 (9 November)
Guest performer: Marcin Wyrostek

Semi-final 4 (16 November)

Semi-final 5 (23 November)
Guest performer: Anna Filipowska

 Originally, Michał Koziołek was among forty semi-finalists and was to perform in the last semi-final, but due to injury during rehearsals he had to withdraw from the competition and was replaced by Kamil Kobędzowski, who performs similar act.

Final (30 November)
The live final took place on 30 November 2013. Sand artist Tetiana Galitsyna was crowned the winner with folk music band Tekla Klebetnica coming second and dancer Santiago Gil third.

Contestants' appearances on earlier talent shows
 Diana John and Piotr Elton Waśkowski made it to the Judges' House on X Factor season three.
 Diana Sasha Staniszewska reached the semi-final (4th place) on "You Can Dance: Po prostu tańcz! season one. Next, Diana was a contestant on the first season of Mam talent! She was eliminated on the auditions. Later, she was a finalist (with her group Top Toys) on season one of Got to Dance. Tylko Taniec.
 The Toobes reached the semi-final on the fourth season on Must be the Music. Tylko Muzyka.
 Julia Szwajcer (from Boso band) and Paweł Piekarski make it to the Bootcamp stage on X Factor season three.
 Temptation reached the final (3rd place) on the second season on Got to Dance. Tylko Taniec.

Ratings

 Includes advert breaks

References

External links
Mam talent!

Mam talent!
2013 Polish television seasons